Salafchegan District is a district (bakhsh) in Qom County, Qom Province, Iran. At the 2006 census, its population was 8,763, in 2,585 families.  The District has one city: Salafchegan. The District has two rural districts: Neyzar Rural District and Rahjerd-e Sharqi Rural District.

References 

Districts of Qom Province
Qom County